Larry Kirksey is an American football coach who is the running backs coach for the Birmingham Stallions of the United States Football League (USFL). He has 17 years' experience coaching in the league and an additional 22 years of coaching experience in the college ranks.

Coaching career

Miami (Ohio)
Kirksey got his start in coaching as the wide receivers/tight ends coach at Miami (Ohio) in 1974, and remained there for three seasons.

University of Kentucky
Kirksey coached wide receivers and tight ends for the Wildcats from 1977 to 1981.

Kansas University
He spent the 1982 season coaching wide receivers and tight ends for the Jayhawks.

Kentucky State University
Kirksey was the 18th head football coach for the Kentucky State University Thorobreds located in Frankfort, Kentucky and he held that position for the 1983 season. His career coaching record at Kentucky State was 2 wins, 7 losses, and 2 ties (.273).

University of Florida
He coached running backs at the University of Florida under Charlie Pell and Galen Hall from 1984 to 1988. During his tenure at Florida, he coached star running backs Lorenzo Hampton, Neal Anderson, John L. Williams and Emmitt Smith.

University of Pittsburgh
After leaving Florida, Kirksey spent one year as running backs coach at Pittsburgh.

University of Alabama
From 1990 to 1993, Kirksey coached running backs for Alabama, where he helped lead the Crimson Tide to a national championship in 1992. Kirksey's running backs led the SEC with 252 rushing yards per game.

San Francisco 49ers
In 1994, Kirksey began his NFL career coaching the NFL's all-time reception and receiving yards leader, Jerry Rice. Under Kirksey, Rice set a then-NFL record with 1,848 receiving yards and had a career-high 122 receptions in 1995. From 1994 to 1999, Rice caught 606 passes for 6,666 yards. Kirksey's receivers helped set a Super Bowl record in Super Bowl XXIX with six touchdown catches, including three by Rice.

Detroit Lions
From 2001 to 2002, Kirksey coached wide receivers for the Detroit Lions, where wide receiver Johnnie Morton had his best season during his NFL career: 77 catches, 1,154 yards and four touchdowns.

Jacksonville Jaguars
Kirksey spent 2003 as the wide receivers coach with the Jacksonville Jaguars, where Jimmy Smith led the team with 54 receptions despite missing four games.

Middle Tennessee State
Kirksey helped lead Middle Tennessee State to the 2006 Sun Belt Conference title and a Motor City Bowl berth as the assistant head coach and running backs coach for the Blue Raiders in 2005.

Houston Texans
Kirksey was most recently the wide receivers coach for the Houston Texans. In seven seasons under Kirksey's tutelage, Andre Johnson averaged an NFL-best 93.6 yards per game, led the league in receiving yards in 2008 and 2009, and led the NFL in receptions in 2008. Johnson joined Jerry Rice as the only receivers in NFL history to lead the league in receiving yards in consecutive seasons and joined Marvin Harrison as the only receivers to surpass 1,500 yards in back-to-back years.

Seattle Dragons
In 2019, Kirksey joined the Seattle Dragons of the XFL as receivers coach.

The Spring League
Kirksey coaches the Sea Lions of The Spring League as of 2021.

Personal life
Kirksey earned a bachelor's degree from Eastern Kentucky in 1974, where he was a four-year letterman and three-year starter at wide receiver. As a senior, he earned all-conference honors. He was out of coaching in 2005 while serving as deputy executive director of the Kentucky Sports Authority. He and wife Anita have two children, Jessica and Jared.

References

External links
 Houston Texans bio

Year of birth missing (living people)
Living people
American football wide receivers
Alabama Crimson Tide football coaches
Denver Broncos coaches
Detroit Lions coaches
Eastern Kentucky Colonels football players
Florida Gators football coaches
Houston Texans coaches
Jacksonville Jaguars coaches
Kentucky State Thorobreds football coaches
Kentucky Wildcats football coaches
Miami RedHawks football coaches
Middle Tennessee Blue Raiders football coaches
Pittsburgh Panthers football coaches
San Francisco 49ers coaches
Seattle Dragons coaches
Texas A&M Aggies football coaches
African-American coaches of American football
African-American players of American football
20th-century African-American sportspeople
21st-century African-American sportspeople
Birmingham Stallions (2022) coaches